Jon M. Bramnick (born February 24, 1953) is an American Republican Party politician, who has served in the New Jersey Senate since 2022, representing the 21st legislative district. He previously served in the New Jersey General Assembly, representing the 21st Legislative District from 2003 to 2022, He also previously served as the Assembly Republican Leader from January 2012 to January 2022.   He was appointed to the Assembly in 2003 to fill the unexpired term of the vacancy created upon the selection of Thomas Kean Jr. to fill an unexpired New Jersey Senate term. He was elected to a full two-year term later that year and was re-elected in 2005, 2007, 2009, 2011, 2013, 2015, 2017 and 2019. He was elected to the New Jersey Senate in 2021.

Early life 
Bramnick was born and raised in Plainfield, New Jersey as the son of Plainfield business owners (Lazaar's Stationers). He graduated from Plainfield High School, received a B.A. in Political Science from the Maxwell School of Citizenship and Public Affairs at Syracuse University and was awarded a J.D. from the Hofstra University School of Law. Before becoming an Assemblyman, Bramnick served two terms on the Plainfield City Council from 1984 to 1991. He is the Republican Municipal Chairman in Westfield, where he resides with his family. Bramnick is a former professor at both Rutgers University and Rider University. Following his graduation from law school, he served as an assistant corporation counsel in New York City. He is an attorney with a private practice in Scotch Plains, New Jersey with the firm of Bramnick, Rodriguez, Grabas, Arnold & Mangan.

New Jersey Assembly 
Following the appointment of Tom Kean, Jr. to the State Senate, a vacancy opened up in the 21st District's Assembly delegation. Bramnick won the most ballots of a vote by members of the Essex, Morris, Somerset, and Union county Republican committee persons of the district beating former Assemblyman James J. Barry, Jr., Millburn mayor Thomas McDermott, and Warren Township Planning Board chairman Dan Gallic. In December 2005 he was appointed Assistant Minority Whip of the Assembly for the 2006–2008 term. In June 2007, Bramnick was selected as the Minority Whip, succeeding Francis J. Blee. In November 2009, he was elected as the Republican Conference Leader, the second-highest leadership position in the Republican caucus. In the Assembly, he has served as Vice Chair of the Legislative Services Commission. After the death of Assembly Republican Leader Alex DeCroce in January 2012, the Assembly Republican caucus chose Bramnick as its new leader. Bramnick has been honored with the 2013 Governor Meyner Award from the Bar Association and the 2011 Legislator of the Year award from the Chamber of Commerce. He was named 2013 Legislator of the Year by the New Jersey Conference of Mayors and was honored at Rider University for his dedication to New Jersey politics and public service. On January 3, 2017, Bramnick announced that he would not run for New Jersey governor in 2017, as he was seen as a potential frontrunner for the Republican gubernatorial nomination.

In 2019, Bramnick voted for gun control measures backed by Democratic representatives in the state legislature.

Committee assignments 
Committee assignments for the 2022—23 Legislative Session session are:
Commerce
Judiciary

District 21 
Each of the 40 districts in the New Jersey Legislature has one representative in the New Jersey Senate and two members in the New Jersey General Assembly. The representatives from the 21st District for the 2022—23 Legislative Session are:
 Senator Jon Bramnick (R)
 Assemblyman Michele Matsikoudis (R)
 Assemblyman Nancy Munoz (R)

Personal life 
Bramnick holds the honorary title of "Funniest Lawyer in New Jersey" after winning contests sponsored by the bar association at Rascals Comedy Club. He often volunteers his services as a comedic auctioneer on behalf of non-profit organizations including Hurricane Sandy victims. Bramnick resides in Westfield, New Jersey with his wife Patricia (married in 1981), and has two grown children and a granddaughter. He is Jewish.

On March 11, 2019, Bramnick self-published a book titled Why People Don’t Like You which is a comedy book about social skills.

Electoral history

New Jersey Senate

New Jersey Assembly

References

External links
Assemblyman Bramnick's legislative web page, New Jersey Legislature
Bramnick, Rodriguez, Grabas, Arnold & Mangan, LLC
New Jersey Legislature financial disclosure forms - 2016 2015 2014 2013 2012 2011 2010 2009 2008 2007 2006 2005 2004
District 21 Candidates Website Kean (Senate), Bramnick & Munoz (Assembly)
Assembly Member Jon M. Bramnick, Project Vote Smart
New Jersey Voter Information Website 2003

|-

|-

1953 births
21st-century American politicians
21st-century American Jews
Jewish American state legislators in New Jersey
Living people
Maurice A. Deane School of Law alumni
Maxwell School of Citizenship and Public Affairs alumni
New Jersey city council members
New Jersey lawyers
Republican Party members of the New Jersey General Assembly
Republican Party New Jersey state senators
Plainfield High School (New Jersey) alumni
Politicians from New York City
Politicians from Plainfield, New Jersey
People from Westfield, New Jersey
Rider University faculty
Rutgers University faculty